McCallum Settlement is a community in the Canadian province of Nova Scotia, located in  Colchester County.

References
 McCallum Settlement on Destination Nova Scotia

Communities in Colchester County
General Service Areas in Nova Scotia